is a Japanese actor.

OVA 
 Ultra Seven - Operation: Solar Energy (Eleking)
 Ultra Seven - The Ground of the Earthlings (Alien Metron) 
 Ultra Seven - Lost Memory
 Ultra Seven - Glory and Legend

Films 
 2003 - Ultraman Cosmos vs. Ultraman Justice: The Final Battle
 2008 - Superior Ultraman 8 Brothers(King Gesura)

TV 
 1999 - Booska! Booska!!(Booska)
 2001 - Ultraman Cosmos
 2006 - Bio Planet WoO(WoO)
 2006 - Ultraman Mebius
 2007 - Ultra Galaxy: Daikaijyu Battle(Gomora)
 2008 - Ultra Galaxy Daikaijyu Battle: Never Ending Odyssey(Gomora)

References

External links

Japanese male film actors
Living people
Year of birth missing (living people)